Tetrabutylammonium bromide (TBAB) is a quaternary ammonium salt with a bromide commonly used as a phase transfer catalyst. It is used to prepare many other tetrabutylammonium salts by salt metathesis reactions. The anhydrous form is a white solid.

In addition to being cheap, tetrabutylammonium bromide is also environmentally friendly, has a greater degree of selectivity, is operationally simple, non-corrosive, and can be recycled easily as well.

Preparation and reactions
Tetrabutylammonium bromide can be prepared by the alkylation of tributylamine with 1-bromobutane.

Tetrabutylammonium bromide is used to prepare other salts of the tetrabutylammonium cation by salt metathesis reactions.

It serves as a source of bromide ions for substitution reactions. It is one of a commonly-used phase transfer catalyst. As its melting point is just over 100 °C and decreases in the presence of other reagents, it can be considered an ionic liquid.

Role in semi-clathrate formation 
TBAB is being extensively studied as a thermodynamic promoter in the formation of semi-clathrate hydrates which greatly brings down the pressure - temperature requirement for forming gas hydrates.

See also 
Tetrabutylammonium tribromide, with an additional Br2 unit
Tetrabutylammonium fluoride
Tetrabutylammonium chloride
Tetrabutylammonium iodide

References

Tetrabutylammonium salts